Samdech Euv, is a title frequently used to refer to Norodom Sihanouk (1922–2012), retired king of Cambodia

Samdech Euv may also refer to:

 Samdech Euv Autonomous Zone (1993), a former separatist region of Kampuchea
 Samdech Euv High School, any of several schools in Cambodia

See also

 Euv (disambiguation)
 Samdech
 
 Queen-mother (disambiguation)